Bowlers Journal International is a monthly magazine dedicated to Ten-pin bowling based in Chicago, Illinois.  Founded as the Bowlers Journal in 1913 by David A. "Dave" Luby (1857–1925), there are now both online and print versions.

It is akin to the British Tenpin Bowling Association's Go Tenpin magazine.

References

External links
Bowlers Journal Online 
Bowling Statistics and Analysis
BowlersHQ: Information on Bowling Balls, Bowling Bags, Bowling Shoes and Accessories

1913 establishments in Illinois
Monthly magazines published in the United States
Sports magazines published in the United States
Magazines established in 1913
Magazines published in Chicago
Ten-pin bowling magazines